JOSA refers to the Journal of the Optical Society of America.

Josa is a municipality in Aragon, Spain.

Josa may also refer to:
 Josa de Cadí, a village in Josa i Tuixén, Catalonia, Spain
 Josa, a genus of spiders in the family Anyphaenidae
 a personal name:
 Mirel Josa (born 1963), Albanian football player and coach
 Josa Lee (1911–1967), Irish hurler

See also 
 Isabel de Josa (1508–1575), Catalan writer
 La Josa (born 1976), Mexican singer and athlete
 Jossa (disambiguation)
 Josa in Korean postpositions